"Upon the Dull Earth" is a fantasy short story by American writer Philip K. Dick, first published in November 1954 in Beyond Fantasy Fiction. 

Both the title and the protagonist's name are taken from Shakespeare's The Two Gentlemen of Verona, Act IV, scene ii:
    
    Then to Silvia let us sing,
    That Silvia is excelling;
    She excels each mortal thing
    Upon the dull earth dwelling;
    To her let us garlands bring.

Plot summary
By offering up the blood of a lamb, Silvia, the protagonist of Upon the Dull Earth, is able to summon creatures she identifies as angels. She thinks that the creatures are her ancestors, and she is sure that one day she will join them. At the same time, though, it is not clear whether the creatures are really good, as Silvia thinks, or wicked. Their behavior and their relation with Silvia scare the girl's relatives and Rick, her boyfriend. Rick thinks that Silvia's behavior is very dangerous, as "the white-winged giants ... can sear [her] to ash". During a quarrel with Rick, the girl accidentally cuts herself. Independently from her will, Silvia's blood summons the creatures. Unable to control their power, the angel-like giants burn Silvia's body and leave only "a brittle burned-out husk".

Unable to accept his lover's death, Rick tries to bring Silvia back, but in doing so he causes the degeneration and destruction of the world he lives in. The story also develops one of Dick's favorite themes, namely the definition of what is real. The reality we think we know well turns out to be insubstantial, due to Dick's use of multiple possible realities which ends up deconstructing the idea of reality itself. As the short story investigates these questions, first at an epistemological level and then at an ontological one, Upon the Dull Earth unfolds like a conventional horror plot. Rick manages to contact the light-creatures who apparently belong to a higher realm of being and he also manages to speak with Silvia. The girl now lives in the realm of the angel-like creatures, but she wants to come back and she explains that they made a mistake when they took her away. The creatures think that bringing Silvia back could be dangerous. Besides, Silvia explains that in order to come back she needs "some shape to enter"  because there are no "material forms" in the higher continuum. She would have to take something from the human world, "something of clay".

At the end of the story, Silvia manages to come back, but the effects of her return are disastrous. As soon as she appears in front of Rick, Silvia realizes that something has gone wrong and that she has taken the place of someone else. In fact, she has taken her sister's body. There is a scene in which Rick sees Betty Lou (Silvia's sister) change and become Silvia, but it is just the beginning of the nightmare atmosphere which engulfs the story's ending. In fact, the process of transformation is not over. Slowly, every member of Silvia's family becomes Silvia. Rick runs away in a fright. The girl has assumed the role of a revenant who invades the body and mind of any living person and spreads like a virus, a curse, leaving no hope for redemption. At the end of the story, after a useless flight, after he has seen service-station attendants, waitresses and common people change into Silvia before his very eyes, Rick looks at himself in a mirror and sees his face slowly becoming Silvia's. Suddenly, the man is gone and only Silvia remains. The girl finds herself alone and does not understand what has happened.

Adaptations
"Upon the Dull Earth" was adapted into an audio drama, "Silvia's Blood", by The Truth.

References

http://etc.dal.ca/belphegor/vol3_no2/articles/03_02_Bettan_TerPKD_en.html
https://soundcloud.com/jonathan-mitchell-1/silvias-blood

External links 
 

Short stories by Philip K. Dick
1954 short stories
Works originally published in Beyond Fantasy Fiction